Donald Forbes Macgregor (23 July 1939 – 3 June 2020) was a Scottish long-distance runner, teacher and politician. He competed in the 1972 Summer Olympics in Munich, representing Great Britain in the men's marathon event, in which he finished in seventh position in 2:16:34. He also competed for Scotland at the Commonwealth Games in 1970 in Edinburgh and 1974 in Christchurch, New Zealand. He had a personal best time of 2:14:15.4.

Biography
Macgregor was born in Edinburgh, and studied at the University of St Andrews. He was chairman of the Royal Burgh of St Andrews Community Council until 2007, and served as a Liberal Democrat councillor on North East Fife District Council from 1988 to 1996. He was principal teacher of German in Madras College, St Andrews from 1974 until 1999, when he retired from full-time teaching. Until 2006 he taught French and German part-time in the Business School of the University of Abertay Dundee and was also a German-language tour guide.

He published a book of poetry, Stars and Spikes (2004, Nutwood Press), following in the footsteps of his father Forbes, who was a more prolific author and published among many other books with a Scottish theme, including the best-selling Greyfriars Bobby – the True Story at Last. More recently Donald was involved in research for John Bryant's books 3:59.4 (2004 – Random House) and The Marathon Makers (2008 – John Blake Publishing) and in photo caption translations for German books about the 2006 World Cup and 2008 Olympic Games. He did this and other translation work for the Olympic historian Volker Kluge (Berlin/Brandenburg).

In May 2007 he was elected to Fife Council as one of the ward members for East Neuk and Landward ward (Liberal Democrat) and forms part of the Fife Council coalition administration with the Scottish National Party. 

Following his running career, he coached distance athletes as a member of Fife Athletic Club. Macgregor and his former wife had three children.

In 2010 he published an autobiography, Running My Life (Pinetree Press, St Andrews). In 2016, with co-author Tim Johnston, a fellow Olympian, he published His Own Man a biography of Dr Otto Peltzer, a German athlete (Pitch Publishers 2016).

References

External links
 

1939 births
2020 deaths
Sportspeople from Edinburgh
Scottish male marathon runners
Scottish male long-distance runners
Olympic athletes of Great Britain
Athletes (track and field) at the 1972 Summer Olympics
Athletes (track and field) at the 1976 Summer Olympics
Commonwealth Games competitors for Scotland
Athletes (track and field) at the 1970 British Commonwealth Games
Athletes (track and field) at the 1974 British Commonwealth Games
Scottish Liberal Democrat councillors
People educated at Stewart's Melville College
Alumni of the University of St Andrews
Academics of the University of Abertay Dundee
Councillors in Fife
Scottish biographers
Scottish autobiographers